Wolfgang Zuckschwerdt is a German judo athlete, who competed for the SG Dynamo Brandenburg / Sportvereinigung (SV) Dynamo. He won medals at international competitions.

References

German male judoka
Living people
Year of birth missing (living people)